Robert M. 'Bob' Wilson (born 4 October 1945) is a former Australian rules footballer who played for Essendon in the Victorian Football League (VFL).

Wilson played his early football at the Essendon Under-19s before being loaned to Brunswick in the Victorian Football Association (VFA). He was then returned to Essendon and made his senior debut in 1966. He made four appearances in the 1966 VFL season, all of which Essendon won, but spent most of his time in the reserves where he won their Best and Fairest. Wilson spent the next two seasons back at Brunswick before being appointed captain-coach of Tasmanian club Scottsdale in 1969. He steered the club to three NTFA premierships and to a Tasmanian State Premiership in 1973.

He left Scottsdale after the 1976 season and then captain-coached Ringarooma. He also had a stint as coach of NWFU club Latrobe.

References

External links

Holmesby, Russell and Main, Jim (2007). The Encyclopedia of AFL Footballers. 7th ed. Melbourne: Bas Publishing.

1945 births
Living people
Australian rules footballers from Victoria (Australia)
Essendon Football Club players
Brunswick Football Club players
Scottsdale Football Club players
Scottsdale Football Club coaches
Latrobe Football Club players